Kinnefjellet is a mountain in Oscar II Land at Spitsbergen, Svalbard. It has peaks with heights of 601 and 544 m.a.s.l. and is located at the southern side of Venernbreen. The mountain is named after the hill of Kinnekulle in the Swedish province of Västergötland.

References

Mountains of Spitsbergen